Shigehiro Taguchi (田口成浩, born March 25, 1990), nicknamed Shige,  is a Japanese professional basketball player for the Akita Northern Happinets of the B.League in Japan. He is a native of Akita prefecture and the most popular player in the "Republic of Pink". He might be the B.League's best current 3-point shooter, and has won the 3 point contest three times.  Taguchi was a new captain of Happinets in 2016.

Career statistics

Regular season 

|-
| align="left" | bj League 2011-12
| align="left" | Akita
| 14 || 1 || 11.6 || 43.6 || 39.2 || 52.9 || 1.4 || 0.4 || 0.3 || 0 || 5.5
|-
| align="left" | bj League 2012-13
| align="left" | Akita
| bgcolor="CFECEC"|52 || 25 || 25.3|| 40.2 || 36.6 || 73.2 || 3.1 || 1.0 || 0.8 || 0.1 || 10.3
|-
| align="left" | bj League 2013-14
| align="left" | Akita
|bgcolor="CFECEC"| 52 ||47 || 26.3 || 46.8 ||bgcolor="CFECEC"| 44.5 || 76.6 || 2.9 || 1.1 || 0.9 ||	0.1 || 11.7
|-
| align="left" | bj League 2014-15
| align="left" | Akita
| bgcolor="CFECEC"|52 ||bgcolor="CFECEC"| 52 || 30.7 || 46.9 || 42.5 || 86.7 || 3.5 || 2.0 || 0.9 || 0.2 || 16.3
|-
| align="left" | bj League 2015-16
| align="left" | Akita
|bgcolor="CFECEC"| 52 ||bgcolor="CFECEC"| 52 || 31.1 || 43.7 || 37.3 || 90.1 || 4.4 ||2.9 || 1.1 || 0.3 || 14.6
|-
|style="background-color:#FFCCCC"  align="left" | B League 2016-17
| align="left" | Akita
| bgcolor="CFECEC"|60 ||bgcolor="CFECEC"| 60 || 32.4 || 40.8 || 39.1 || 82.4 || 4.1 || 1.1 || 0.9 || 0.1 || 11.5
|-
| align="left" | B League 2017-18
| align="left" | Akita
|bgcolor="CFECEC"|60 || 40||25.5||44.8||42.7||bgcolor="CFECEC"|88.7||2.5||3.2||1.1||0.1||11.7
|-
| align="left" | 2018-19
| align="left" | Chiba Jets
|59|| 1||15.0||43.9||44.5||79.4||1.3||0.8||0.4||0.1||5.1
|-
| align="left" | 2019-20
| align="left" | Chiba Jets
|40|| 40||21.9||42.8||40.0||84.4||1.6||1.6||0.8||0.1||6.4
|-
| align="left" | 2020-21
| align="left" | Chiba jets
|56|| 2||9.4||29.4||25.9||76.2||0.64||0.64||0.32||0.05||2.30

Playoffs 

|-
|style="text-align:left;"|2013-14
|style="text-align:left;"|Akita
| 6 || 6 || 32.00 || .425 || .450 || .833 || 3.5 || 0.0 || 1.17 || 0 ||8.0
|-
|style="text-align:left;"|2017-18
|style="text-align:left;"|Akita
| 5 || 4 || 22.40 || .447 || .440 || 1.000 || 2.0 || 2.8 || 0.6 || 0.2 ||12.0
|-
|style="text-align:left;"|2018-19
|style="text-align:left;"|Chiba Jets
| 5 || 0 || 20.45 || .552 || .583 || .909 || 1.6 || 1.2 || 0.0 || 0.0 ||11.2
|-

Early cup games 

|-
|style="text-align:left;"|2017
|style="text-align:left;"|Akita
| 2 || 1 || 21.32 || .533 || .500 || 1.000 || 3.5 || 3.0 || 2.0 || 0 || 11.5
|-
|style="text-align:left;"|2018
|style="text-align:left;"|Chiba Jets
|3 || 1 || 16.23 || .600 || .500 || .667 || 0.7 || 1.3 || 1.0 || 0 || 5.7
|-
|style="text-align:left;"|2019
|style="text-align:left;"|Chiba Jets
|2 || 0 || 13.55 || .250 || .000 || .000 || 0.5 || 2.5 || 0.5 || 0 || 1.0
|-

William Jones Cup

|-
| align="left" |  2016
| align="left" | Japan
|7|| ||5|| .063|| .000|| .000|| 0.7||0.3 || 0.0|| 0.0|| 0.3
|-

East Asia Super League

|-
| align="left" |  2018
| align="left" | Chiba Jets
|2|| ||12.2|| || || .500|| 2.0||0.5 || 0.0|| 0.0|| 5.5
|-
| align="left" |  2019
| align="left" | Chiba Jets
|2|| ||19.6|| || || .000|| 1.0||0.5 || 1.5|| 0.0|| 10.0
|-

Trivia 
 
His trademark call "Oisa" comes from the festival shout of Kakunodate, Semboku.

Personal 
His sister Kiwako Hashimoto also plays basketball.

References

External links
B.League 3 Point Contest 2017
Kanemaru vs Taguchi
Advanced to Finals in Ariake

1990 births
Living people
Akita Northern Happinets players
Chiba Jets Funabashi players
Japanese men's basketball players
Sportspeople from Akita Prefecture
Shooting guards